A centaur, or occasionally hippocentaur, is a creature from Greek mythology with the upper body of a human and the lower body and legs of a horse.

Centaurs are thought of in many Greek myths as being as wild as untamed horses, and were said to have inhabited the region of Magnesia and Mount Pelion in Thessaly, the Foloi oak forest in Elis, and the Malean peninsula in southern Laconia. Centaurs are subsequently featured in Roman mythology, and were familiar figures in the medieval bestiary. They remain a staple of modern fantastic literature.

Etymology 
The Greek word kentauros is generally regarded as being of obscure origin. The etymology from ken + tauros, 'piercing bull', was a euhemerist suggestion in Palaephatus' rationalizing text on Greek mythology, On Incredible Tales (Περὶ ἀπίστων), which included mounted archers from a village called Nephele eliminating a herd of bulls that were the scourge of Ixion's kingdom. Another possible related etymology can be "bull-slayer".

Mythology

Creation of centaurs
The centaurs were usually said to have been born of Ixion and Nephele. As the story goes, Nephele was a cloud made into the likeness of Hera in a plot to trick Ixion into revealing his lust for Hera to Zeus. Ixion seduced Nephele and from that relationship centaurs were created. Another version, however, makes them children of Centaurus, a man who mated with the Magnesian mares. Centaurus was either himself the son of Ixion and Nephele (inserting an additional generation) or of Apollo and the nymph Stilbe. In the latter version of the story, Centaurus's twin brother was Lapithes, ancestor of the Lapiths.

Another tribe of centaurs was said to have lived on Cyprus.  According to Nonnus, they were fathered by Zeus, who, in frustration after Aphrodite had eluded him, spilled his seed on the ground of that land. Unlike those of mainland Greece, the Cyprian centaurs were horned.

There were also the Lamian Pheres, twelve rustic daimones (spirits) of the Lamos river. They were set by Zeus to guard the infant Dionysos, protecting him from the machinations of Hera, but the enraged goddess transformed them into ox-horned Centaurs. The Lamian Pheres later accompanied Dionysos in his campaign against the Indians.

The centaur's half-human, half-horse composition has led many writers to treat them as liminal beings, caught between the two natures they embody in contrasting myths; they are both the embodiment of untamed nature, as in their battle with the Lapiths (their kin), and conversely, teachers like Chiron.

Centauromachy
The Centaurs are best known for their fight with the Lapiths who, according to one origin myth, would have been cousins to the centaurs. The battle, called the Centauromachy, was caused by the centaurs' attempt to carry off Hippodamia and the rest of the Lapith women on the day of Hippodamia's marriage to Pirithous, who was the king of the Lapithae and a son of Ixion. Theseus, a hero and founder of cities, who happened to be present, threw the balance in favour of the Lapiths by assisting Pirithous in the battle. The Centaurs were driven off or destroyed. Another Lapith hero, Caeneus, who was invulnerable to weapons, was beaten into the earth by Centaurs wielding rocks and the branches of trees. In her article "The Centaur: Its History and Meaning in Human Culture," Elizabeth Lawrence claims that the contests between the centaurs and the Lapiths typify the struggle between civilization and barbarism.

The Centauromachy is most famously portrayed in the Parthenon metopes by Phidias and in a Renaissance-era sculpture by Michelangelo.

List of centaurs 

 Abas, attended Pirithous' wedding, fought against the Lapiths and fled.
 Agrius, repelled by Heracles in a fight.
 Amphion, tried to plunder Pholus of his wine and was killed by Heracles.
 Amycus, son of Ophion. He attended Pirithous' wedding and fought against the Lapiths. Amycus was killed by Pelates.
 Anchius, repelled by Heracles when he tried to steal the wine of Pholus.
 Antimachus, attended Pirithous' wedding, fought in the battle against the Lapiths and was killed by Caeneus.
 Aphareus, killed by Theseus in the fight at Pirithous' wedding.
 Aphidas, killed by Phorbas in the fight at Pirithous' wedding.
 Arctus, attended Pirithous' wedding and fought against the Lapiths.
 Areos, attended Pirithous' wedding and fought against the Lapiths.
 Argius, killed by Heracles when he tried to steal the wine of Pholus.
 Asbolus, an augur who had attempted in vain to dissuade his friends from engaging in battle against the Lapiths at Pirithous' wedding.
 Bienor, attended Pirithous' wedding, fought in the battle against the Lapiths and was killed by Theseus.
 Bromus, attended Pirithous' wedding, fought in the battle against the Lapiths and was killed by Caeneus.
 Chiron
 Chromis, attended Pirithous' wedding, fought in the battle against the Lapiths and was killed by Pirithous.
 Chthonius, attended Pirithous' wedding, fought in the battle against the Lapiths and was killed by Nestor.
 Clanis, attended Pirithous' wedding, fought in the battle against the Lapiths and was killed by Peleus.
 Crenaeus, attended Pirithous' wedding, fought in the battle against the Lapiths and was killed by Dryas.
 Cyllarus, attended Pirithous' wedding, fought in the battle against the Lapiths. Killed by a javelin thrown from an unknown hand. He was married to Hylonome.
 Daphnis, tried to plunder Pholus of his wine and was killed by Heracles.
 Demoleon, attended Pirithous' wedding, fought in the battle against the Lapiths and was killed by Peleus.
 Dictys, attended Pirithous' wedding, fought in the battle against the Lapiths and was killed by Pirithous.
 Dorylas, attended Pirithous' wedding, fought in the battle against the Lapiths and was killed by Peleus.
 Doupon, tried to plunder Pholus of his wine and was killed by Heracles.
 Dryalus, son of Peuceus who attended Pirithous' wedding and fought against the Lapiths.
 Echeclus, attended Pirithous' wedding, fought in the battle against the Lapiths and was killed by Ampyx.
 Elatus, tried to plunder Pholus of his wine. Heracles shot an arrow at him, which, passing through his arm, stuck in the knee of Chiron.
 Elymus, attended Pirithous' wedding, fought in the battle against the Lapiths and was killed by Caeneus.
 Eurynomus, fought against the Lapiths at Pirithous' wedding. Killed by Dryas.
 Eurytion, acted in an insulting manner towards Hippolyte when she was being joined in marriage to Azan in the house of Pirithous. He was killed by Heracles.
 Eurytus, the wildest of the wild Centaurs. He started the fight at Pirithous' wedding and was killed by Theseus.
 Gryneus, fought against the Lapiths at Pirithous' wedding and was killed by Exadius.
 Helops, attended Pirithous' wedding and fought in the battle against the Lapiths. While fleeing from Pirithous, he fell from a precipice into the top of a tree and impaled his body.
 Hippasus, fought against the Lapiths at Pirithous' wedding. Killed by Theseus.
 Hippotion, another Centaur, killed by Heracles when he tried to steal the wine of Pholus.
 Hodites, fought against the Lapiths at Pirithous' wedding. Killed by Mopsus.
 Homadus, tried to plunder Pholus of his wine. Some time after he attempted to rape Alcyone, a granddaughter of Perseus. He got killed in Arcadia.
 Hylaeus, tried to rape Atalanta but was shot by her (same thing happened to Rhoecus).
 Hylaeus, killed by Heracles under unknown circumstances.
 Hylaeus, followed Dionysus in his Indian campaign and was killed by Orontes, an Indian General.
 Hyles, attended Pirithous' wedding, fought in the battle against the Lapiths and was killed by Peleus.
 Hylonome, attended Pirithous' wedding together with her lover Cyllarus. Having seen the latter dead, she threw herself upon the spear which had killed him.
 Imbreus, fought against the Lapiths at Pirithous' wedding and was killed by Dryas.
 Iphinous, fought against the Lapiths at Pirithous' wedding and was killed by Peleus.
 Isoples, killed by Heracles when he tried to steal the wine of Pholus.
 Latreus, fought against the Lapiths at Pirithous' wedding and was killed by Caeneus.
 Lycabas, attended Pirithous' wedding, fought against the Lapiths and fled.
 Lycidas, fought against the Lapiths at Pirithous' wedding and was killed by Dryas.
 Lycopes, fought against the Lapiths at Pirithous' wedding and was killed by Theseus.
 Lycus, fought against the Lapiths at Pirithous' wedding was killed by Pirithous.
 Medon, attended Pirithous' wedding, fought against the Lapiths and fled.
 Melanchaetes, killed by Heracles when he tried to steal the wine of Pholus.
 Melaneus, attended Pirithous' wedding, fought against the Lapiths and fled.
 Mermerus, wounded by the Lapiths at Pirithous' wedding and fled.
 Mimas, attended Pirithous' wedding and fought against the Lapiths.
 Monychus, attended Pirithous' wedding and fought in the battle against the Lapiths. He was conquered by Nestor, mounted on his unwilling back.
 Nedymnus, fought against the Lapiths at Pirithous' wedding. Killed by Theseus.
 Nessus, a black Centaur. Fled during the fight with the Lapiths at Pirithous' wedding. Later he attempted to rape Deianira and before dying gave her a charm which resulted in the death of Heracles. He was killed by the latter.
 Ophion, father of Amycus.
 Orius or Oreius, killed by Heracles when he tried to steal the wine of Pholus.
 Orneus, attended Pirithous' wedding fought against the Lapiths and fled.
 Perimedes, son of Peuceus and attended Pirithous' wedding and fought against the Lapiths.
 Petraeus, fought against the Lapiths at Pirithous' wedding and was killed by Pirithous.
 Peuceus, father of Perimedes and Dryalus.
 Phaecomes, fought against the Lapiths at Pirithous' wedding and was killed by Nestor.
 Phlegraeus, fought against the Lapiths at Pirithous' wedding and was killed by Peleus.
 Pholus
 Phrixus, killed by Heracles when he tried to steal the wine of Pholus.
 Pisenor, attended Pirithous' wedding, fought against the Lapiths and fled.
 Pylenor, having been wounded by Heracles washed himself in the river Anigrus, thus providing the river with a peculiar odor.
 Pyracmus, fought against the Lapiths at Pirithous' wedding and was killed by Caeneus.
 Pyraethus, fought against the Lapiths at Pirithous' wedding and was killed by Periphas.
 Rhoecus, He also tried to rape Atalanta and was killed by her.
 Rhoetus, fought against the Lapiths at Pirithous' wedding and was killed by Dryas.
 Ripheus, fought against the Lapiths at Pirithous' wedding and was killed by Theseus.
 Styphelus, fought against the Lapiths at Pirithous' wedding and was killed by Caeneus.
 Teleboas, fought against the Lapiths at Pirithous' wedding and was killed by Nestor.
 Thaumas, attended Pirithous' wedding, fought against the Lapiths and fled.
 Thereus, this Centaur used to catch bears and carry them home alive and struggling. Attended Pirithous' wedding and fought in the battle against the Lapiths. Killed by Theseus.
 Thereus, killed by Heracles when he tried to steal the wine of Pholus.
 Ureus, attended Pirithous' wedding and fought against the Lapiths.

Origin of the myth
The most common theory holds that the idea of centaurs came from the first reaction of a non-riding culture, as in the Minoan Aegean world, to nomads who were mounted on horses. The theory suggests that such riders would appear as half-man, half-animal. Bernal Díaz del Castillo reported that the Aztecs also had this misapprehension about Spanish cavalrymen. The Lapith tribe of Thessaly, who were the kinsmen of the Centaurs in myth, were described as the inventors of horse-riding by Greek writers. The Thessalian tribes also claimed their horse breeds were descended from the centaurs.

Robert Graves (relying on the work of Georges Dumézil, who argued for tracing the centaurs back to the Indian Gandharva), speculated that the centaurs were a dimly remembered, pre-Hellenic fraternal earth cult who had the horse as a totem. A similar theory was incorporated into Mary Renault's The Bull from the Sea.

Variations

Female centaurs

Though female centaurs, called centaurides or centauresses, are not mentioned in early Greek literature and art, they do appear occasionally in later antiquity. A Macedonian mosaic of the 4th century BC is one of the earliest examples of the centauress in art.  Ovid also mentions a centauress named Hylonome who committed suicide when her husband Cyllarus was killed in the war with the Lapiths.

India
The Kalibangan cylinder seal, dated to be around 2600-1900 BC, found at the site of Indus-Valley civilization shows a battle between men in the presence of centaur-like creatures. Other sources claim the creatures represented are actually half human and half tigers, later evolving into the Hindu Goddess of War. These seals are also evidence of Indus-Mesopotamia relations in the 3rd millennium BC.

In a popular legend associated with Pazhaya Sreekanteswaram Temple in Thiruvananthapuram, the curse of a saintly Brahmin transformed a handsome Yadava prince into a creature having a horse's body and the prince's head, arms, and torso in place of the head and neck of the horse.

Kinnaras, another half-man, half-horse mythical creature from Indian mythology, appeared in various ancient texts, arts, and sculptures from all around India. It is shown as a horse with the torso of a man where the horse's head would be, and is similar to a Greek centaur.

Russia
A centaur-like half-human, half-equine creature called Polkan appeared in Russian folk art and lubok prints of the 17th–19th centuries. Polkan is originally based on Pulicane, a half-dog from Andrea da Barberino's poem I Reali di Francia, which was once popular in the Slavonic world in prosaic translations.

Artistic representations

Classical art 

The extensive Mycenaean pottery found at Ugarit included two fragmentary Mycenaean terracotta figures which have been tentatively identified as centaurs. This finding suggests a Bronze Age origin for these creatures of myth. A painted terracotta centaur was found in the "Hero's tomb" at Lefkandi, and by the Geometric period, centaurs figure among the first representational figures painted on Greek pottery. An often-published Geometric period bronze of a warrior face-to-face with a centaur is at the Metropolitan Museum of Art.

In Greek art of the Archaic period, centaurs are depicted in three different forms.  Some centaurs are depicted with a human torso attached to the body of a horse at the withers, where the horse's neck would be; this form, designated "Class A" by Professor Paul Baur, later became standard.  "Class B" centaurs are depicted with a human body and legs joined at the waist to the hindquarters of a horse; in some cases centaurs of both Class A and Class B appear together.  A third type, designated "Class C", depicts centaurs with human forelegs terminating in hooves. Baur describes this as an apparent development of Aeolic art, which never became particularly widespread.  At a later period, paintings on some amphorae depict winged centaurs.

Centaurs were also frequently depicted in Roman art. One example is the pair of centaurs drawing the chariot of Constantine the Great and his family in the Great Cameo of Constantine (circa AD 314–16), which embodies wholly pagan imagery, and contrasts sharply with the popular image of Constantine as the patron of early Christianity.

Medieval art 

Centaurs preserved a Dionysian connection in the 12th-century Romanesque carved capitals of Mozac Abbey in the Auvergne. Other similar capitals depict harvesters, boys riding goats (a further Dionysiac theme), and griffins guarding the chalice that held the wine. Centaurs are also shown on a number of Pictish carved stones from north-east Scotland erected in the 8th–9th centuries AD (e.g., at Meigle, Perthshire). Though outside the limits of the Roman Empire, these depictions appear to be derived from Classical prototypes.

Modern art 
The John C. Hodges library at The University of Tennessee hosts a permanent exhibit of a "Centaur from Volos" in its library. The exhibit, made by sculptor Bill Willers by combining a study human skeleton with the skeleton of a Shetland pony, is entitled "Do you believe in Centaurs?". According to the exhibitors, it was meant to mislead students in order to make them more critically aware.

In heraldry 
Centaurs are common in European heraldry, although more frequent in continental than in British arms. A centaur holding a bow is referred to as a sagittarius.

Literature

Classical literature 

Jerome's version of the Life of St Anthony the Great, written by Athanasius of Alexandria about the hermit monk of Egypt, was widely disseminated in the Middle Ages; it relates Anthony's encounter with a centaur who challenged the saint, but was forced to admit that the old gods had been overthrown. The episode was often depicted in The Meeting of St Anthony Abbot and St Paul the Hermit by the painter Stefano di Giovanni, who was known as "Sassetta". Of the two episodic depictions of the hermit Anthony's travel to greet the hermit Paul, one is his encounter with the demonic figure of a centaur along the pathway in a wood.

Lucretius, in his first-century BC philosophical poem On the Nature of Things, denied the existence of centaurs based on their differing rate of growth. He states that at the age of three years, horses are in the prime of their life while humans at the same age are still little more than babies, making hybrid animals impossible.

Medieval literature

Centaurs are among the creatures which 14th-century Italian poet Dante placed as guardians in his Inferno. In Canto XII, Dante and his guide Virgil meet a band led by Chiron and Pholus, guarding the bank of Phlegethon in the seventh circle of Hell, a river of boiling blood in which the violent against their neighbours are immersed, shooting arrows into any who move to a shallower spot than their allotted station. The two poets are treated with courtesy, and Nessus guides them to a ford. In Canto XXIV, in the eighth circle, in Bolgia 7, a ditch where thieves are confined, they meet but do not converse with Cacus (who is a giant in the ancient sources), wreathed in serpents and with a fire-breathing dragon on his shoulders, arriving to punish a sinner who has just cursed God. In his Purgatorio, an unseen spirit on the sixth terrace cites the centaurs ("the drunken double-breasted ones who fought Theseus") as examples of the sin of gluttony.

Modern day literature

C.S. Lewis' The Chronicles of Narnia series depicts centaurs as the wisest and noblest of creatures. Narnian Centaurs are gifted at stargazing, prophecy, healing, and warfare; a fierce and valiant race always faithful to the High King Aslan the Lion.

In J.K. Rowling's Harry Potter series, centaurs live in the Forbidden Forest close to Hogwarts, preferring to avoid contact with humans. They live in societies called herds and are skilled at archery, healing, and astrology, but like in the original myths, they are known to have some wild and barbarous tendencies.

With the exception of Chiron, the centaurs in Rick Riordan's Percy Jackson & the Olympians are seen as wild party-goers who use a lot of American slang. Chiron retains his mythological role as a trainer of heroes and is skilled in archery. In Riordan's subsequent series, Heroes of Olympus, another group of centaurs are depicted with more animalistic features (such as horns) and appear as villains, serving the Gigantes.

Philip Jose Farmer's World of Tiers series (1965) includes centaurs, called Half-Horses or Hoi Kentauroi. His creations address several of the metabolic problems of such creatures—how could the human mouth and nose intake sufficient air to sustain both itself and the horse body and, similarly, how could the human ingest sufficient food to sustain both parts.

Brandon Mull's Fablehaven series features centaurs that live in an area called Grunhold. The centaurs are portrayed as a proud, elitist group of beings that consider themselves superior to all other creatures. The fourth book also has a variation on the species called an Alcetaur, which is part man, part moose.

The myth of the centaur appears in John Updike's novel The Centaur. The author depicts a rural Pennsylvanian town as seen through the optics of the myth of the centaur. An unknown and marginalized local school teacher, just like the mythological Chiron did for Prometheus, gave up his life for the future of his son who had chosen to be an independent artist in New York.

Gallery

See also
Other hybrid creatures appear in Greek mythology, always with some liminal connection that links Hellenic culture with archaic or non-Hellenic cultures:
Furietti Centaurs
Hippocamp
Hybrid (mythology)
Ipotane
Legendary creature
Lists of legendary creatures
Minotaur
Onocentaur
Ichthyocentaur
Sagittarius
Satyr

Also,
Hindu Kamadhenu
Indian Kinnara which are half-horse and half-man creature.
Islamic Buraq, a heavenly steed often portrayed as an equine being with a human face. 
Philippine Tikbalang
Roman Faun, and the Hippopodes of Pomponius Mela, Pliny the Elder, and later authors.
Scottish Each uisge and Nuckelavee
Welsh Ceffyl Dŵr

Additionally, Bucentaur, the name of several historically important Venetian vessels, was linked to a posited ox-centaur or βουκένταυρος (boukentauros) by fanciful and likely spurious folk-etymology.

Footnotes

References

References 

 Apollodorus, The Library with an English Translation by Sir James George Frazer, F.B.A., F.R.S. in 2 Volumes, Cambridge, MA, Harvard University Press; London, William Heinemann Ltd. 1921. ISBN 0-674-99135-4. Online version at the Perseus Digital Library. Greek text available from the same website.
 Diodorus Siculus, The Library of History translated by Charles Henry Oldfather. Twelve volumes. Loeb Classical Library. Cambridge, Massachusetts: Harvard University Press; London: William Heinemann, Ltd. 1989. Vol. 3. Books 4.59–8. Online version at Bill Thayer's Web Site
Diodorus Siculus, Bibliotheca Historica. Vol 1-2. Immanel Bekker. Ludwig Dindorf. Friedrich Vogel. in aedibus B. G. Teubneri. Leipzig. 1888–1890. Greek text available at the Perseus Digital Library.
Gaius Julius Hyginus, Fabulae from The Myths of Hyginus translated and edited by Mary Grant. University of Kansas Publications in Humanistic Studies. Online version at the Topos Text Project.
 Gaius Valerius Flaccus, Argonautica translated by Mozley, J H. Loeb Classical Library Volume 286. Cambridge, MA, Harvard University Press; London, William Heinemann Ltd. 1928. Online version at theio.com.
 Gaius Valerius Flaccus, Argonauticon. Otto Kramer. Leipzig. Teubner. 1913. Latin text available at the Perseus Digital Library.
 Hesiod, Shield of Heracles from The Homeric Hymns and Homerica with an English Translation by Hugh G. Evelyn-White, Cambridge, MA.,Harvard University Press; London, William Heinemann Ltd. 1914. Online version at the Perseus Digital Library. Greek text available from the same website.
Homer, The Odyssey with an English Translation by A.T. Murray, Ph.D. in two volumes. Cambridge, MA., Harvard University Press; London, William Heinemann, Ltd. 1919. . Online version at the Perseus Digital Library. Greek text available from the same website.
 Lucius Mestrius Plutarchus, Lives with an English Translation by Bernadotte Perrin. Cambridge, MA. Harvard University Press. London. William Heinemann Ltd. 1914. 1. Online version at the Perseus Digital Library. Greek text available from the same website.
Nonnus of Panopolis, Dionysiaca translated by William Henry Denham Rouse (1863-1950), from the Loeb Classical Library, Cambridge, MA, Harvard University Press, 1940.  Online version at the Topos Text Project.
Nonnus of Panopolis, Dionysiaca. 3 Vols. W.H.D. Rouse. Cambridge, MA., Harvard University Press; London, William Heinemann, Ltd. 1940–1942. Greek text available at the Perseus Digital Library.
Pausanias, Description of Greece with an English Translation by W.H.S. Jones, Litt.D., and H.A. Ormerod, M.A., in 4 Volumes. Cambridge, MA, Harvard University Press; London, William Heinemann Ltd. 1918. . Online version at the Perseus Digital Library
 Pausanias, Graeciae Descriptio. 3 vols. Leipzig, Teubner. 1903.  Greek text available at the Perseus Digital Library.
 Publius Ovidius Naso, Metamorphoses translated by Brookes More (1859-1942). Boston, Cornhill Publishing Co. 1922. Online version at the Perseus Digital Library.
 Publius Ovidius Naso, Metamorphoses. Hugo Magnus. Gotha (Germany). Friedr. Andr. Perthes. 1892. Latin text available at the Perseus Digital Library.
Publius Vergilius Maro, Aeneid. Theodore C. Williams. trans. Boston. Houghton Mifflin Co. 1910. Online version at the Perseus Digital Library.
Publius Vergilius Maro, Bucolics, Aeneid, and Georgics. J. B. Greenough. Boston. Ginn & Co. 1900. Latin text available at the Perseus Digital Library.
Sextus Propertius, Elegies from Charm. Vincent Katz. trans. Los Angeles. Sun & Moon Press. 1995. Online version at the Perseus Digital Library. Latin text available at the same website.

Further reading
M. Grant and J. Hazel. Who's Who in Greek Mythology. David McKay & Co Inc, 1979.

 Homer's Odyssey, Book 21, 295ff
Harry Potter, books 1, 3, 4, 5, 6, and 7.
The Chronicles of Narnia, book 2.
Percy Jackson & the Olympians, book 1, 2, 3, 4 and 5.
Frédérick S. Parker. Finding the Kingdom of the Centaurs.

External links

Theoi Project on Centaurs in literature
Centaurides on female centaurs
MythWeb  article on centaurs
Harry Potter Lexicon article on centaurs in the Harry Potter universe
Erich Kissing's centaurs contemporary art

 
Greek legendary creatures
Roman legendary creatures
Horses in mythology
Mythological human hybrids